Michael Brendan McElroy (born May 18, 1939) is the Gilbert Butler Professor of Environmental Studies at Harvard University. His research initially revolved around the origin and evolution of the planets to an emphasis on effects of human activity on the global environment of the Earth, especially climate change.

From Northern Ireland originally, he was educated at Queen's University Belfast, receiving a B.Sc. in applied mathematics in 1960, and completing his Ph.D. in applied mathematics in 1962. 

McElroy has worked in atmospheric science at Harvard, and leads atmospheric science and policy work. He heads Harvard University's Center for the Environment and chairs the Interfaculty Initiative on the Environment. In 1984 he won the George Ledlie prize for his work on planetary atmospheres. He served as Founding Chair of Harvard's Department of Earth and Planetary Sciences and has focused his research especially on effects of human activities on the global environment.  

He has recorded two audible books, The Modern Scholar: Global Warming, Global Threat (2004)

Selected publications
Energy: Perspectives, Problems, and Prospects. (2010) Oxford: Oxford University Press. 
The atmospheric environment : effects of human activity. (2002) Princeton: Princeton University Press. 
Energizing China: Reconciling Environmental Protection and Economic Growth, co-authored with Chris P. Nielsen and Peter Lydon. (1998). Harvard University Center for the Environment, China Project. 
A 1984 paper he co-authored with Steven Wofsy and Michael J. Prather on potential non-linear destruction of the ozone layer helped persuade the United States Environmental Protection Agency to carry out a risk assessme nt of chlorofluorocarbons that laid the groundwork for the negotiation of the Montreal Protocol.

Honors
American Academy of Arts and Sciences (elected 1972) 
Royal Irish Academy (elected Honorary Member, Science 2009]

References

Living people
John A. Paulson School of Engineering and Applied Sciences faculty
Harvard University faculty
Irish emigrants to the United States
Scientists from Belfast
1939 births
Members of the Royal Irish Academy
Atmospheric scientists